Denise Jefferson Casper (born January 9, 1968) is an American attorney serving as a United States district judge of the United States District Court for the District of Massachusetts. She used to be the Deputy District Attorney for the Middlesex District Attorney's Office in Cambridge, Massachusetts. Casper is the first black female judge to serve on the federal bench in Massachusetts. Judge Casper is also notable for presiding over the criminal trial of Whitey Bulger.

Early life and education 

Casper was born in East Patchogue, New York. Casper received her Bachelor of Arts from Wesleyan University in 1990 and her Juris Doctor from Harvard Law School in 1994.

Career 

Casper started her professional career as a law clerk for Edith W. Fine and J. Harold Flannery of the Massachusetts Appeals Court. During the period of 1995 through 1998, she was an attorney with the firm of Bingham McCutchen, where she conducted civil litigation. In 1999 Casper became an Assistant United States Attorney in Boston and was the deputy chief of the Organized Crime Drug Enforcement Task Force starting in 2004. She served as an assistant United States attorney in Boston from 1999 until 2005 and taught legal writing at Boston University School of Law from 2005 through 2007. Casper served as the deputy district attorney for the Middlesex District Attorney’s Office in Cambridge, Massachusetts from 2007 until her confirmation as a federal judge.

Federal judicial service

Casper was nominated by President Barack Obama on April 28, 2010, to a seat on the United States District Court for the District of Massachusetts vacated by Judge Reginald C. Lindsay. She was confirmed by the United States Senate on December 17, 2010, and received her commission on December 20, 2010.

Notable cases
In 2013, Judge Casper presided over the trial, conviction and sentencing of Boston's infamous organized crime boss Whitey Bulger.

In 2017, Judge Casper was assigned to be the presiding judge in a matter of Alasaad v. Duke.

In 2020, Judge Casper was assigned the Equal Means Equal et al v. David Ferriero case. A lawsuit brought to require the Archivist of the United States to certify the Equal Rights Amendment as part of the U.S. Constitution. On August 6, 2020, Casper ruled that the Plaintiffs did not have standing to sue the Archivist to compel him to ratify the ERA and she therefore could not determine the merits of the case. Casper thereby granted the Defendants' Motion to Dismiss.

Personal

Casper married her husband, Marc N. Casper, in 1994. He is President and CEO of Thermo Fisher Scientific.

See also 
 List of African-American federal judges
 List of African-American jurists
 List of first women lawyers and judges in Massachusetts

References

External links

1968 births
Living people
21st-century American judges
21st-century American women judges
African-American judges
American judges
American women lawyers
American lawyers
Assistant United States Attorneys
Harvard Law School alumni
Judges of the United States District Court for the District of Massachusetts
People from East Patchogue, New York
United States district court judges appointed by Barack Obama
Wasserstein Fellows
Wesleyan University alumni